Chaîne may refer to:

Marius Chaîne – French scholar.
Chaîne (novel) – a 1974 novel by Saidou Bokoum about Africans living in France.
Radio Algeria radio stations:
 Chaîne 1 in Arabic.
 Chaîne 2 in Berber.
 Chaîne 3 in French.